Hydnum vesterholtii is a species of fungus in the family Hydnaceae native to the southern and Central Europe and southwestern China.

References 

Fungi described in 2012
Fungi of Europe
vesterholtii